Emanuele Orlandi (born 4 February 1988) is an Italian professional footballer who plays for Prima Divisione club Carrarese. On 30 October 2011 he scores the first hattrick of his professional career against Piacenza Calcio.

External links 
 Profile at official club website 
 Profile at Assocalciatori.it 

1988 births
Living people
Italian footballers
A.C. Milan players
Association football forwards